Marcia Manon (born Marcia Elizabeth Harrison, October 28, 1896 – April 12, 1973) was a film actress active during the silent film era of the 1910s and 1920s. She was a supporting player who worked with stars Mary Pickford, John Barrymore, Ethel Clayton, William S. Hart, and Wallace Reid. She retired from movies with the coming of sound film.

She bore a resemblance to actress Clara Kimball Young and was sometimes billed as Camille Ankewich.

Manon died at Victorville, California in 1973.

Filmography
The Prison Without Walls (1917) (as Camille Ankewich)
The Hostage (1917) (as Camille Ankewich)
Stella Maris (1918)
One More American (1918) (as Camille Ankewich)
Amarilly of Clothes-Line Alley (1918) (uncredited)
Old Wives for New (1918)
The Claw (1918)
Missing (1918)
The Savage Woman (1918)
The Girl Who Came Back (1918)
The Border Wireless (1918)
Maggie Pepper (1919)
The Test of Honor (1919)
Captain Kidd, Jr. (1919)
A Daughter of the Wolf (1919)
The Woman Michael Married (1919)
The Lottery Man (1919)
In Old Kentucky (1919)
Life's Twist (1920)
 The Forbidden Thing (1920)
 All's Fair in Love (1921)
Ladies Must Live (1921)
The Masquerader (1922)
Skin Deep (1922)
 The Woman He Loved (1922)
 Justice of the Far North (1925)
The Greater Glory (1926)
Heaven on Earth (1927)
The Vanishing Pioneer (1928)
They Had to See Paris (1929)
Love, Live and Laugh (1929)

References

External links

 Marcia Manon at IMDb.com
AFI listing , Marcia Manon

1896 births
1973 deaths
Actresses from Paris
French emigrants to the United States
20th-century French women